The Masonic Hall in Farmington, Washington is a historic building constructed in 1908.  It has also been known as Farmington Community Center.  It was built as a meeting hall for a local Masonic Lodge and was donated to the town in 1985.

It was listed on the National Register of Historic Places in 1987 under the name Masonic Hall.

References

Clubhouses on the National Register of Historic Places in Washington (state)
Masonic buildings completed in 1908
Buildings and structures in Whitman County, Washington
Former Masonic buildings in Washington (state)
National Register of Historic Places in Whitman County, Washington
1908 establishments in Washington (state)